Zhao Yingzi (born 16 December 1990), previously known as Zhao Han Ying Zi, is a Chinese actress.

Filmography

Film

Television series

Discography

References

1990 births
Living people
Central Academy of Drama alumni
21st-century Chinese actresses
Actresses from Yantai
Chinese film actresses
Chinese television actresses